Toyota Canada Inc. (TCI) is the distributor of Toyota and Lexus sedans, coupes, sport utility vehicles (SUVs), and trucks in Canada.  TCI's head office is located in Toronto, Ontario. It has regional offices located in Vancouver, Calgary, Montreal, and Halifax and parts distribution centers in Toronto and Vancouver.

In January 2013, TCI became a subsidiary of Toyota Motor Corporation (TMC) with 51% ownership share and Mitsui & Co. Ltd. as minority 49% shareholder.  The current CEO and president of Toyota Canada is Larry Hutchinson, who replaced Seiji Ichii on January 1, 2016.

In October 1990, TCI expanded its operations to begin selling luxury vehicles to Canadians through the Lexus brand. Twenty years later, in October 2010, TCI further expanded its sales operations to begin selling Scion branded vehicles in Canada.  As of July 2014, there are 247 Toyota, 38 Lexus, and 92 Scion franchises in Canada.

In 2014, half (50%) of all Toyota vehicles sold in Canada were built at Toyota Motor Manufacturing Canada, Inc., (TMMC) while 83% of all Toyota vehicles sold in Canada were produced at one of Toyota's 14 plants throughout North America.

Manufacturing and engineering in Canada
Toyota operates two vehicle manufacturing facilities in Canada: one in Cambridge, Ontario and another in Woodstock, Ontario. The Cambridge Facility currently produces the Toyota RAV4 (since 2019) and Lexus RX 350 (since 2003) and RX 450h (since 2014) and formerly produced the Toyota Corolla (1988–2019), Solara (1998–2003), and Matrix (2002–2013). The Woodstock Facility currently only builds the RAV4, which has been in production since 2007.

Since opening in 1988, TMMC has built more than 6 million vehicles for Canadian and U.S. consumers with the vast majority (approximately 4.6 million) being exported to the United States. In September 2003, TMMC's Cambridge facility was expanded and became the first Toyota plant outside Japan to manufacture the Lexus RX.  Production was further expanded in 2014 to also produce the Lexus RX 450h.  It is expected to continue to be the only Lexus manufacturer outside Japan until Fall 2015 when Lexus ES 350 production is expected to commence at Toyota Motor Manufacturing Kentucky, Inc. (TMMK).  In 2014, TMMC remains the largest Toyota plant in North America by production volume (579,411 vehicles) with a 15% increase in production versus 2013.

Toyota's Canadian operation has received various awards and recognitions. TMMC's plant has earned 14 J.D. Power & Associates Plant Quality awards including SIX (6) Gold awards and TWO (2) coveted Platinum Plant Quality Award in 2011 and 2014 – the first Toyota plant outside Japan that has ever won this award.

Toyota also operates several parts manufacturing operations in Canada including Canadian Auto Parts Toyota, Inc. (CAPTIN), a wholly owned subsidiary of TMC which manufactures aluminium alloy wheels for the global market. Established in Delta, British Columbia in 1983, the 24,645 sq m. facility produced approximately 1.7 million aluminium alloy wheels and employed 310 people in 2013.   In August 2011, CAPTIN and the University of British Columbia announced a partnership to refine the manufacturing process for water-cooled die casting to produce stronger, lighter, and lower-cost aluminium wheels.

Toyota Canada's Cold Weather Testing Centre was established in 1974 in Timmins, Ontario to test vehicles from across Toyota's global lineup to ensure optimal performance in extreme cold weather conditions. With the addition of a cold chamber, Toyota can test vehicles year-round in harsh sub-zero conditions to ensure that vehicles meet highest customer expectations.

Safety
In 2011, Toyota introduced the Star Safety System™ as a standard for every new vehicle. It features six advanced accident-avoidance safety technologies:
Anti-Lock Braking System (ABS) - helps prevent brakes from locking up by "pulsing" brake pressure to each wheel to help you stay in control in emergency braking situations
Brake Assist - designed to detect sudden or "panic" braking and adds the full pressure needed to help prevent a collision
Electronic Brake Force Distribution (EBD) – helps keep the vehicle more stable and balanced when braking
Vehicle Stability Control (VSC) - helps prevent wheel slip and loss of traction by reducing engine power and applying brake force to the wheels that need it
Traction Control - helps maintain traction on wet, icy, loose, or uneven surfaces by applying brake force to the spinning wheel(s)
Smart Stop Technology - automatically cuts engine power and allows the brakes to take precedence over the accelerator when both pedals are pressed at the same time

In January 2011, Toyota launched the Collaborative Safety Research Centre (CSRC) to serve as a catalyst for the advancement of auto safety in North America. Toyota shares its talent, technology, and data with many research partners including the University of Toronto. They focus on a wide range of issues, from improving driver-and-vehicle command interfaces to advanced pre-crash notification systems. Toyota aims to share the results of its research so that the automotive industry can benefit.

Toyota also partners with other stakeholders engaged in road safety research, development of safe driving programs, new safety technologies, and hands-on driver education.
The Traffic Injury Research Foundation (TIRF) is Canada's road safety research institute. Since 2002, Toyota Canada has partnered with TIRF to conduct studies and develop educational resources for young drivers. More recently, they have turned the focus to helping all Canadians better understand the often complex and wide-ranging safety technologies in today's automobiles.

KartSTART is a hands-on driver's education program that uses go-karts to introduce young drivers to the demands and dynamics of life behind the wheel.

Advanced technology powertrains
TCI markets hybrid electric vehicles under the Toyota and Lexus brands throughout Canada, including the Prius, the world's first mass-produced gas-electric hybrid vehicle.  Since the launch of the Prius in Canada in 2000, Toyota and Lexus have added an additional 10 hybrids and 1 hybrid plug-in vehicle to its Canadian model line-up:
Toyota Prius
Toyota Prius c
Toyota Prius v
Toyota Camry Hybrid
Toyota Prius Plug-in Hybrid
Toyota Highlander Hybrid
Toyota RAV4 Hybrid
Lexus CT 200h
Lexus ES 300h
Lexus GS 450h
Lexus LS 600h L
Lexus RX 450h
Lexus NX 300h

Since the introduction of the Toyota Prius in 2000, more than 75% of all hybrid vehicles sold in Canada were made by Toyota.  In September 2014, Toyota celebrated the sale of its 100,000th hybrid vehicle in Canada.  Toyota estimates that Toyota and Lexus hybrids have saved Canadians almost 260 million liters of fuel - the equivalent of 103 Olympic-sized swimming pools.

Environment
Since 2001, Toyota Canada Inc. has maintained ISO 14001 registration for an effective environmental management system (EMS).  TCI's head office was the first Toyota facility in North America to achieve this certification. 
TCI has established a Corporate Environmental Policy which outlines its commitment towards continually reducing the daily impact of all its activities, services and operations. TCI also contributes to the publication of an annual North American Environmental Report on progress, success, and future inspirations.  A number of Toyota's Canadian dealerships have also achieved LEED Gold Standard, one of the strictest levels of LEED certification.

Through the Toyota Evergreen Learning Grounds, Toyota Canada and its dealerships have contributed over $3.2 million in grants to more than 5,500 schools and impacted more than 1.15 million students through projects that transform school grounds into green outdoor classrooms since 2000.

Notes

Canada Inc.
Scion (automobile)
Lexus
Vehicle manufacturing companies established in 1964
Companies based in Scarborough, Toronto
Car manufacturers of Canada
Canadian brands
Canadian subsidiaries of foreign companies
Hybrid vehicles
Electric vehicle manufacturers of Canada